Joseph Blair (born June 12, 1974) is an American former professional basketball player, and current assistant coach for the Washington Wizards of the National Basketball Association (NBA). He was formerly the Philadelphia 76ers assistant coach. Standing 2.10m (6 ft 10.75 in) tall, and weighing 120 kg (265 pounds), he spent his playing career playing at the positions of power forward and center. He was reputed for his spectacular playing style, most notably while he was a member of the Harlem Globetrotters.

High school
Blair attended school and played basketball at C.E. King High School, in Houston, Texas.

College career
Blair played four seasons of college basketball with the Arizona Wildcats of the Pacific-10 Conference in the NCAA Division I. He averaged 10.4 points and 6.5 rebounds per game during his collegiate career, and he was a member of Arizona's two regular season Pac-10 championships, in 1993 and 1994. He was a starter on the Arizona squad that advanced to the 1994 NCAA Final Four.

As of the 2014–15 season, he held the Arizona program's record for highest career field goal percentage (61.3%), and also ranked eighth on the school's all-time shot blocking records list, with 101 blocks.

Professional career
Though he was drafted 35th overall in the 1996 NBA Draft, by the Seattle SuperSonics, Blair didn't sign with the team, and his agent engineered his release in 1997. Later in his career, a preseason game with the Chicago Bulls in 2007, was the closest he came to playing in the NBA, before being waived by the Bulls in October, less than two weeks after being signed.

After being released by Seattle, he moved to Europe, signing in France with Pau-Orthez for the 1997–98 season.

After a return to the U.S., to play for the Harlem Globetrotters and the Long Island Surf, the latter of the United States Basketball League (USBL), Blair returned to Europe in 1998.

He moved to the Italian LBA league, in which he would spend a good part of his career, with Biella, Scavolini Pesaro, and Armani Jeans Milano, participating in the league's All-Star Game in 2000, 2005, and 2006, and leading the league in rebounds in the 1999–00 season.

He had an interlude with PAOK of the Greek Basket League in the 2000–01 season, which he described as a "bad experience", due to salary arrears. He did not finish that season in Greece, and instead finished it playing with the Harlem Globetrotters again.

Whilst playing with the Italian club Pesaro in the EuroLeague, Europe's premier club competition, he was selected to the 2001–02 All-EuroLeague Second Team.

Blair played for Ülkerspor for two years, in the Turkish Basketball Super League and the EuroLeague. He was named the 2002–03 season EuroLeague Regular Season MVP, whilst playing for the club.

He finished his career in the Russian Basketball Super League 1, playing first with Spartak Primorje, with whom he led the league in rebounding, during the 2007–08 season, and then with another Russian team, Spartak Saint Petersburg.

Coaching career
Blair returned to the Arizona Wildcats college program for the 2013–14 season, serving as an undergraduate assistant coach, and helping the team's big men. For the 2014–15 season, he was moved to the school's graduate manager position, and in these roles he was credited with helping Arizona players like Kaleb Tarczewski and Brandon Ashley realize their potential. He was not offered a position at the University of Arizona for the 2015–16 season.

On October 14, 2015, Blair was hired by the NBA D-League's Rio Grande Valley Vipers, as an assistant coach. On October 10, 2018, Blair was named the new head coach of the NBA D-League's Rio Grande Valley Vipers. On June 26, 2019, Blair was hired as an assistant coach of the Philadelphia 76ers. On October 15, 2020, Blair left the 76ers for the Minnesota Timberwolves.

He joined the Washington Wizards for the 2021–22 season.

In lieu of the absence of Wizards Head Coach Wes Unseld Jr., Blair won his first game as a head coach on January 17, 2022, beating the Philadelphia 76ers 117–98.

Personal life
After being inspired by the youth camps run by the Harlem Globetrotters, in which he previously participated, Blair founded the Blair Charity Group. Described as, "a local charity group that focuses on Tucson’s youth", the group provides free-of-charge "leadership and social-skill based basketball camps and clinics" around the Tucson area. Though basketball is at the center of the charity, it also aims to provide education and social skills to children. The charity remains fee less, as to not deprive unprivileged children of an opportunity.

Two of Blair's three children were born in Italy, both with a former Italian girlfriend. After playing in three different cities in the country, he also speaks fluent Italian.

Since finishing his playing career in 2009, Blair has lived in Tucson, Arizona, where the University of Arizona is located. He returned to the university to finish his degree, which he obtained in 2014.

References

External links 
EuroLeague Profile Retrieved on June 9, 2015
RealGM.com Profile Retrieved on June 9, 2015
Italian LBA Profile Retrieved on June 9, 2015 
TBLStat.net Profile Retrieved on October 28, 2022

1974 births
Living people
African-American basketball players
American expatriate basketball people in France
American expatriate basketball people in Greece
American expatriate basketball people in Italy
American expatriate basketball people in Russia
American expatriate basketball people in Turkey
American men's basketball players
Arizona Wildcats men's basketball players
Basketball coaches from Ohio
Basketball players from Akron, Ohio
BC Spartak Primorye players
BC Spartak Saint Petersburg players
Centers (basketball)
Élan Béarnais players
Harlem Globetrotters players
Lega Basket Serie A players
Minnesota Timberwolves assistant coaches
Olimpia Milano players
Pallacanestro Biella players
P.A.O.K. BC players
Philadelphia 76ers assistant coaches
Power forwards (basketball)
Rio Grande Valley Vipers coaches
Seattle SuperSonics draft picks
Ülker G.S.K. basketball players
Victoria Libertas Pallacanestro players
Washington Wizards assistant coaches
21st-century African-American sportspeople
20th-century African-American sportspeople